The 2020 Autotrader EchoPark Automotive 500 was a NASCAR Cup Series race that was held on October 25, 2020 at Texas Motor Speedway in Fort Worth, Texas. Contested over 334 laps on the 1.5 mile (2.4 km) intermediate quad-oval, it was the 34th race of the 2020 NASCAR Cup Series season, the eighth race of the Playoffs, and second race of the Round of 8. Rain forced the race to be stopped after 52 laps, and the race was re-commenced on Wednesday, October 28.

Report

Background

Texas Motor Speedway is a speedway located in the northernmost portion of the U.S. city of Fort Worth, Texas – the portion located in Denton County, Texas. The track measures  around and is banked 24 degrees in the turns, and is of the oval design, where the front straightaway juts outward slightly. The track layout is similar to Atlanta Motor Speedway and Charlotte Motor Speedway (formerly Lowe's Motor Speedway). The track is owned by Speedway Motorsports, Inc., the same company that owns Atlanta and Charlotte Motor Speedway, as well as the short-track Bristol Motor Speedway.

Entry list
 (R) denotes rookie driver.
 (i) denotes driver who are ineligible for series driver points.

Qualifying
Kevin Harvick was awarded the pole for the race as determined by competition-based formula.

Starting Lineup

Race

Stage Results

Stage One
Laps: 105

Stage Two
Laps: 105

Final Stage Results

Stage Three
Laps: 124

Race statistics
 Lead changes: 23 among 11 different drivers
 Cautions/Laps: 8 for 47
 Red flags: 1 for 72 hours, 28 minutes and 34 seconds
 Time of race: 3 hours, 42 minutes and 14 seconds
 Average speed:

Media

Television
NBC Sports covered the race on the television side. Rick Allen, Two–time Texas winner Jeff Burton, Steve Letarte and 2000 Texas winner Dale Earnhardt Jr. called the action from the booth on Sunday. Allen, Burton and Letarte called the action from the booth on Wednesday. Dave Burns, Parker Kligerman and Kelli Stavast handled the pit road duties on Sunday, Kligerman and Marty Snider handled the pit road duties on Wednesday.

Radio
PRN covered their final 2020 broadcast, which was also simulcast on Sirius XM NASCAR Radio. Doug Rice & Mark Garrow covered the action for PRN when the field raced down the front straightaway. Rob Albright covered the action for PRN from a platform outside of Turns 1 & 2, & Pat Patterson covered the action from a platform outside of Turns 3 & 4 for PRN. Brad Gillie, Brett McMillan and Wendy Venturini had the call from pit lane for PRN.

Standings after the race

Drivers' Championship standings

Manufacturers' Championship standings

Note: Only the first 16 positions are included for the driver standings.

References

Autotrader EchoPark Automotive 500
Autotrader EchoPark Automotive 500
NASCAR races at Texas Motor Speedway
Autotrader EchoPark Automotive 500